Marque Perry (born January 28, 1981) is an American professional basketball player who last played for BG Göttingen of the Basketball Bundesliga (BBL). He plays at the point guard position.

Amateur career
Perry, out of Prosser High School, continued the city of Chicago's great point guard tradition. he played college basketball at Saint Louis University. In his final season (2002–03) he averaged 16.8 points, 4.6 rebounds, 3.3 assists and 1.0 steals per game in 31 games. His season-high was 28 points in a 65–57 win over DePaul on February 1, 2003.

Notes

External links
Marque Perry Stats, News, Photos - San Antonio Spurs - ESPN
Euroleague & Eurocup Profile
TBLStat.net Profile
Eurobasket.com Profile

1981 births
Living people
American expatriate basketball people in Germany
American expatriate basketball people in Greece
American expatriate basketball people in Israel
American expatriate basketball people in Italy
American expatriate basketball people in Latvia
American expatriate basketball people in Romania
American expatriate basketball people in Russia
American expatriate basketball people in Slovenia
American expatriate basketball people in Turkey
American expatriate basketball people in Ukraine
American men's basketball players
Bandırma B.İ.K. players
Basketball players from Chicago
BC Donetsk players
BC Samara players
BC Ural Yekaterinburg players
BC Zenit Saint Petersburg players
Beşiktaş men's basketball players
BG Göttingen players
BK VEF Rīga players
Fortitudo Pallacanestro Bologna players
İstanbul Büyükşehir Belediyespor basketball players
KK Olimpija players
Olympiacos B.C. players
Orlandina Basket players
Point guards
Roanoke Dazzle players
Saint Louis Billikens men's basketball players
United States men's national basketball team players